Schweizer Sportfernsehen (SSF) is a Swiss private TV broadcaster specialized in sport events. SSF was founded in 2007 and started broadcasting on July 1st 2009. In 2013 it was relaunched as SportSzene fernsehen (SSf), allowing more variety to the program by adding cultural and economical aspects.

Program
 Monday Evening: "Kick it!" hosted by Claudia Lässer and Jörg Stiel
 Monday Evening: Live "Challenge League" (Fussball)
 Tuesday Evening: "SSF-Magazin" hosted by Vania Spescha
 Wednesday Evening: "Volleyball NLA"
 Thursday Evening: "SportWoche" hosted by Gabriel Oldham
 Sunday Evening: "Outlaws" hosted by Gian Simmen

References

External links
"Schweizer Sportfernsehen" Homepage

Sports television in Switzerland
Television stations in Switzerland
Television channels and stations established in 2007
2007 establishments in Switzerland